The National Portrait Gallery (NPG) is an art gallery in London housing a collection of portraits of historically important and famous British people. It was arguably the first national public gallery dedicated to portraits in the world when it opened in 1856. The gallery moved in 1896 to its current site at St Martin's Place, off Trafalgar Square, and adjoining the National Gallery. It has been expanded twice since then. The National Portrait Gallery also has regional outposts at Beningbrough Hall in Yorkshire and Montacute House in Somerset. It is unconnected to the Scottish National Portrait Gallery in Edinburgh, with which its remit overlaps. The gallery is a non-departmental public body sponsored by the Department for Digital, Culture, Media and Sport.

Collection

The gallery houses portraits of historically important and famous British people, selected on the basis of the significance of the sitter, not that of the artist. The collection includes photographs and caricatures as well as paintings, drawings and sculpture. One of its best-known images is the Chandos portrait, the most famous portrait of William Shakespeare although there is some uncertainty about whether the painting actually is of the playwright.

Not all of the portraits are exceptional artistically, although there are self-portraits by William Hogarth, Sir Joshua Reynolds and other British artists of note. Some, such as the group portrait of the participants in the Somerset House Conference of 1604, are important historical documents in their own right. Often, the curiosity value is greater than the artistic worth of a work, as in the case of the anamorphic portrait of Edward VI by William Scrots, Patrick Branwell Brontë's painting of his sisters Charlotte, Emily and Anne, or a sculpture of Queen Victoria and Prince Albert in medieval costume. Portraits of living figures were allowed from 1969. In addition to its permanent galleries of historical portraits, the National Portrait Gallery exhibits a rapidly changing selection of contemporary work, stages exhibitions of portrait art by individual artists and hosts the annual BP Portrait Prize competition.

History and buildings

The three people largely responsible for the founding of the National Portrait Gallery are commemorated with busts over the main entrance. At centre is Philip Henry Stanhope, 4th Earl Stanhope, with his supporters on either side, Thomas Babington Macaulay, 1st Baron Macaulay (to Stanhope's left) and Thomas Carlyle (to Stanhope's right). It was Stanhope who, in 1846 as a Member of Parliament (MP), first proposed the idea of a National Portrait Gallery. It was not until his third attempt, in 1856, this time from the House of Lords, that the proposal was accepted. With Queen Victoria's approval, the House of Commons set aside a sum of £2000 to establish the gallery. As well as Stanhope and Macaulay, the founder Trustees included Benjamin Disraeli and Lord Ellesmere. It was the latter who donated the Chandos portrait to the nation as the gallery's first portrait. Carlyle became a trustee after the death of Ellesmere in 1857.

For the first 40 years, the gallery was housed in various locations in London. The first 13 years were spent at 29 Great George Street, Westminster. There, the collection increased in size from 57 to 208 items, and the number of visitors from 5,300 to 34,500. In 1869, the collection moved to Exhibition Road and buildings managed by the Royal Horticultural Society. Following a fire in those buildings, the collection was moved in 1885, this time to the Bethnal Green Museum. This location was ultimately unsuitable due to its distance from the West End, condensation and lack of waterproofing. Following calls for a new location to be found, the government accepted an offer of funds from the philanthropist William Henry Alexander. Alexander donated £60,000 followed by another £20,000, and also chose the architect, Ewan Christian. The government provided the new site, St Martin's Place, adjacent to the National Gallery, and £16,000. The buildings, faced in Portland stone, were constructed by Shillitoe & Son. Both the architect, Ewan Christian, and the gallery's first director, George Scharf, died shortly before the new building was completed. The gallery opened at its new location on 4 April 1896. The site has since been expanded twice. The first extension, in 1933, was funded by Lord Duveen, and resulted in the wing by architect Sir Richard Allison on a site previously occupied by St George's Barracks running along Orange Street.

In February 1909, a murder–suicide took place in a gallery known as the Arctic Room. In an apparently planned attack, John Tempest Dawson, aged 70, shot his 58 year–old wife, Nannie Caskie; Dawson shot her from behind with a revolver, then shot himself in the mouth, dying instantly. His wife died in hospital several hours later. Both were American nationals who had lived in Hove for around 10 years. Evidence at the inquest suggested that Dawson, a wealthy and well–travelled man, was suffering from a persecutory delusion. The incident came to public attention in 2010 when the Gallery's archive was put on-line as this included a personal account of the event by James Donald Milner, then the Assistant Director of the Gallery.

The collections of the National Portrait Gallery were stored at Mentmore Towers in Buckinghamshire during the Second World War, along with pieces from the Royal Collection and paintings from Speaker's House in the Palace of Westminster.

Early 21st century
The second extension was funded by Sir Christopher Ondaatje and a £12m Heritage Lottery Fund grant, and was designed by London-based architects Edward Jones and Jeremy Dixon. The Ondaatje Wing opened in 2000 and occupies a narrow space of land between the two 19th-century buildings of the National Gallery and the National Portrait Gallery, and is notable for its immense, two-storey escalator that takes visitors to the earliest part of the collection, the Tudor portraits.

In January 2008, the Gallery received its largest single donation to date, a £5m gift from U.S. billionaire Randy Lerner.

In January 2012, Catherine, Princess of Wales announced the National Portrait Gallery as one of her official patronages. Her portrait was unveiled in January 2013. The gallery holds nearly 20 portraits of Harriet Martineau and her brother James Martineau, whose great-nephew Francis Martineau Lupton was the Duchess's great-great-grandfather.

Bodelwyddan Castle's partnership with the National Portrait Gallery came to an end in 2017 after its funding was cut by Denbighshire County Council.

In June 2017 it was announced that the NPG has been awarded funding of £9.4 million from the Heritage Lottery Fund towards its major transformation programme Inspiring People, the Gallery's biggest ever development. The Gallery had already raised over £7m of its £35.5m target. The building works were scheduled to start in 2020.

In October 2019, a group of semi-naked environmental campaigners were drenched in fake oil, in the Ondaatje Wing main hall, as part of a protest against BP's sponsorship of a collection of pieces in the gallery. The protest performance piece, which was entitled Crude Truth, involve a clothed protester reciting a monologue in which they called upon arts organisations to sever ties with companies "funding extinction". Three activists covered in black liquid lay down for about five minutes on a plastic sheet before standing up again, wiping themselves down with towels, and cleaning up after themselves. The action, which was applauded by onlookers, passed uninterrupted.

Closure and refurbishment in 2020–2023
A major programme of refurbishment with the project name of "Inspiring People" will lead to the gallery's closure from 2020 to 2023.  Some galleries will close by late May 2020, with full closure by July 2020.  There are a number of planned exhibitions and collaborations around the UK to display parts of the collection while the gallery is closed.  These will include exhibitions starting at the York Art Gallery in 2021, the Holburne Museum, Bath (Tudor portraits, 2022), and museums in Liverpool, Newcastle, Coventry and Edinburgh, which will later tour to other venues.  Other partners include the National Trust, the National Maritime Museum and the National Gallery. In London, the shops and restaurants will close, but the Heinz Archive and Library will remain open. Another programme, called "Coming Home", loans portraits of individual people to museums in their home towns.  Exhibitions will also travel to Japan, Australia and the United States.

The "Inspiring People" project "comprises a comprehensive redisplay of the Collection from the Tudors to now, combined with a complete refurbishment of the building, the creation of new public spaces, a more welcoming visitor entrance and public forecourt, and a new state of the art Learning Centre". The East Wing will return to being gallery space, with its own new street entrance.

Exterior busts
In addition to the busts of the three founders of the gallery over the entrance, the exterior of two of the original 1896 buildings are decorated with stone block busts of eminent portrait artists, biographical writers and historians. These busts, sculpted by Frederick R. Thomas, depict James Granger, William Faithorne, Edmund Lodge, Thomas Fuller, The Earl of Clarendon, Horace Walpole, Hans Holbein the Younger, Sir Anthony van Dyck, Sir Peter Lely, Sir Godfrey Kneller, Louis François Roubiliac, William Hogarth, Sir Joshua Reynolds, Sir Thomas Lawrence and Sir Francis Chantrey.

Finances and staff
The National Portrait Gallery is an executive non-departmental public body of the UK Government, sponsored by the Department for Digital, Culture, Media and Sport.

The National Portrait Gallery's total income in 2007–2008 amounted to £16,610,000, the majority of which came from government grant-in-aid (£7,038,000) and donations (£4,117,000). As of 31 March 2008, its net assets amounted to £69,251,000. In 2008, the NPG had 218 full-time equivalent employees. It is an exempt charity under English law.

Directors
1857–1895: Sir George Scharf KCB
1895–1909: Sir Lionel Cust KCVO FSA – previously at the Department of Prints and Drawings at the British Museum, and from 1901 to 1927 filled the role of Surveyor of the King's Pictures.
1909–1916: Charles John Holmes – Later director of the National Gallery
1917–1927: James Milner
1927–1951: Henry Hake
1951–1964: Charles Kingsley Adams
1964–1967: Sir David Piper – Later director of the Fitzwilliam Museum and fellow of Christ's College, Cambridge (1967–1973), and first director of the Ashmolean Museum (1973–1985)
1967–1973: Sir Roy Strong
1974–1994: John Hayes
1994–2002: Charles Saumarez Smith
2002–2015: Sandy Nairne CBE, FSA
2015–present: Nicholas Cullinan

Legal threat against Wikipedia volunteer 

On 14 July 2009, the National Portrait Gallery sent a demand letter alleging breach of copyright against an editor-user of Wikipedia, who downloaded thousands of high-resolution reproductions of public domain paintings from the NPG website, and placed them on Wikipedia's sister media repository site, Wikimedia Commons. The Gallery's position was that it held copyright in the digital images uploaded to Wikimedia Commons, and that it had made a significant financial investment in creating these digital reproductions. Whereas single-file low resolution images were already available on its website, the images added to Wikimedia Commons were re-integrated from separate files after the user "found a way to get around their software and download high-resolution images without permission."

In 2012, the Gallery licensed 53,000 low-resolution images under a Creative Commons licence, making them available free of charge for non-commercial use. A further 87,000 high-resolution images are available for academic use under the Gallery's own licence that invites donations in return; previously, the Gallery charged for high-resolution images.

, 100,000 images, around a third of the Gallery's collection, had been digitised.

See also 
 BP Portrait Award
 British Photographic Portrait Prize
 Royal Society of Portrait Painters

References

Notes

Bibliography
"Inspiring People", National Portrait Gallery News Release, Tuesday 5 November 2019, "National Portrait Gallery Collection to Travel across the UK as Inspiring People Redevelopment Begins in July 2020"; see also NPG Project Summary

Further reading
 Cannadine, David, National Portrait Gallery: a Brief History, National Portrait Gallery, 2007,  
 Hulme, Graham, The National Portrait Gallery: an Architectural History, National Portrait Gallery Publications, 2000, 
 Saumarez Smith, Charles, The National Portrait Gallery, 2nd. rev. ed., National Portrait Gallery, 2010,

External links
 
 

 
Art museums established in 1856
Grade I listed buildings in the City of Westminster
Grade I listed museum buildings
Museums sponsored by the Department for Digital, Culture, Media and Sport
Non-departmental public bodies of the United Kingdom government
Exempt charities
Charities based in London
1856 establishments in England
Photography museums and galleries in England
Ewan Christian buildings